The 2019 Dutch Open (officially known as the Yonex Dutch Open 2019 for sponsorship reasons) was a badminton tournament which took place at Topsportcentrum in Almere, Netherlands, from 8 to 13 October 2019 and had a total purse of $75,000.

Tournament
The 2019 Dutch Open was the ninth Super 100 tournament of the 2019 BWF World Tour and also part of the Dutch Open championships, which has been held since 1932. This tournament was organized by the Badminton Nederland and was sanctioned by the BWF.

Venue
This international tournament was held at Topsportcentrum in Almere, Flevoland, Netherlands.

Point distribution
Below is the point distribution table for each phase of the tournament based on the BWF points system for the BWF Tour Super 100 event.

Prize money
The total prize money for this tournament was US$75,000. Distribution of prize money was in accordance with BWF regulations.

Men's singles

Seeds

 Sameer Verma (third round)
 Rasmus Gemke (second round)
 Mark Caljouw (second round)
 Sourabh Verma (second round)
 Thomas Rouxel (second round)
 Victor Svendsen (third round)
 Toby Penty (third round)
 Lucas Corvée (second round)

Finals

Top half

Section 1

Section 2

Bottom half

Section 3

Section 4

Women's singles

Seeds

 Line Kjærsfeldt (second round)
 Kirsty Gilmour (first round)
 Carolina Marín (withdrew)
 Evgeniya Kosetskaya (final)
 Neslihan Yiğit (first round)
 Zhang Yiman (semi-finals)
 Yvonne Li (second round)
 Pai Yu-po (semi-finals)

Finals

Top half

Section 1

Section 2

Bottom half

Section 3

Section 4

Men's doubles

Seeds

 Liao Min-chun / Su Ching-heng (semi-finals)
 Marcus Ellis / Chris Langridge (quarter-finals)
 Mark Lamsfuß / Marvin Emil Seidel (final)
 Lu Ching-yao / Yang Po-han (quarter-finals)
 Vladimir Ivanov / Ivan Sozonov (champions)
 Huang Kaixiang / Liu Cheng (quarter-finals)
 Ou Xuanyi / Zhang Nan (semi-finals)
 Jelle Maas / Robin Tabeling (quarter-finals)

Finals

Top half

Section 1

Section 2

Bottom half

Section 3

Section 4

Women's doubles

Seeds

 Gabriela Stoeva / Stefani Stoeva (champions)
 Maiken Fruergaard / Sara Thygesen (withdrew)
 Ekaterina Bolotova / Alina Davletova (semi-finals)
 Selena Piek / Cheryl Seinen (quarter-finals)
 Chloe Birch / Lauren Smith (first round)
 Émilie Lefel / Anne Tran (first round)
 Delphine Delrue / Léa Palermo (quarter-finals)
 Emma Karlsson / Johanna Magnusson (second round)

Finals

Top half

Section 1

Section 2

Bottom half

Section 3

Section 4

Mixed doubles

Seeds

 Marcus Ellis / Lauren Smith (semi-finals)
 Chris Adcock / Gabby Adcock (final)
 Robin Tabeling / Selena Piek (champions)
 Mark Lamsfuß / Isabel Herttrich (second round)
 Rodion Alimov / Alina Davletova (first round)
 Ben Lane / Jessica Pugh (first round)
 Sam Magee / Chloe Magee (second round)
 Marvin Emil Seidel / Linda Efler (first round)

Finals

Top half

Section 1

Section 2

Bottom half

Section 3

Section 4

References

External links
 Tournament Link

Dutch Open (badminton)
Dutch Open
Dutch Open (badminton)
Dutch Open
Dutch Open (badminton)
Sports competitions in Almere